Chervyen  or Cherven, previously known as Ihumen until 1923, is a town in Minsk Region, Belarus. It is the administrative center of Chervyen District. As of 2016, it had a population of 9,718.

History
On February 1, 1942 the German forces and local policemen surrounded the Cherven ghetto. At the same time, other Jews living outside the ghetto walls, such as in the local hospital, were gathered together. They were ordered to undress to their undergarments and lie on the ground, where they were shot dead. Witnesses put the number of victims at between 1,500-1,750 people. The murder operation was carried out by the Einsatzkommando 8 unit of Einsatzgruppe B, with the help of local policeman.

On 25–27 June 1941, the Soviet NKVD carried out a mass execution of political prisoners from Minsk in the nearby Tsagelnya forest. Wooden statue Mourning Angel, by sculptor Gennady Matusevich, was erected at the location. Commemorative events are held there every year in June.

Geography
Located 66 km east of Minsk and 45 km west of Berezino, Chervyen lies on a plain in the middle of its raion. It is crossed to the north by the M4 highway Minsk-Mogilev. The national road P59 links it with the town of Smalyavichy (50 km north) and the Minsk National Airport (65 km north).

Notable people

 Vladimir Isaacovich Fundator (1903-86), metallurgist who invented the technology which made possible the aluminum diesel engine for the T-34 tank, thus facilitating the rapid advance of the Red Army in World War 2; recipient USSR Council of Ministers Prize.

 Leivik Halpern (1888-1962), Yiddish poet and literary editor who under the pen name H Leivik wrote The Golem, among other works.
 David Nisnevich (1893-1963), composer of Russian and Yiddish folk songs.
 Lieutenant Semion Gurevich (1915-1984), distinguished himself by leading a Red Army attack across the Dnieper River in September 1943, for which he received the title Hero of the Soviet Union.
 Professor David Movshevitch Golub (1901-2001), distinguished anatomist and embryologist; Academician of the National Academy of Sciences of Belarus; recipient Red Banner of Labour.
 Professor Feival Movshevitch Golub, brother of David, headed the Department of Surgical Diseases, Samarkand State Medical Institute, Uzbekistan; recipient Honorary Scientist of the Uzbek Soviet Socialist Republic.
 Vladimir Adomovich Korol (1912-1980), architect involved in the plans to rebuild Minsk after the destruction of World War 2; received Order of Lenin.   
Oleg Novitskiy (b. 1971), Russian cosmonaut.
Valery Shary (b. 1947), Olympic light-heavyweight weightlifting champion.

Gallery

References

Further reading
Lipińska G., Jeśli zapomnę o nich..., 1990
Stankiewicz-Januszczak, J., Marsz śmierci – ewakuacja więźniów z Mińska do Czerwieni 24–27 czerwca 1941 r., Volumen (1999) (Polish)
Stankiewicz-Januszczak J., Dziś mówię ludziom, co mówiłam Bogu...,  (Polish)
Petruitis J., Kaip jie mus sušaudė, Kaunas, 1942, 1990 (Lith.)
Tumas J. Kelias į Červenę, Vilnius, 1990 (Lith.)

External links 

 Chervyen official website
 History of the town
 Photos on Radzima.org
 Local prison and statues
 The murder of the Jews of Chervyen’ during World War II, at the Yad Vashem website
 

Towns in Belarus
Populated places in Minsk Region
Chervyen District
Minsk Voivodeship
Igumensky Uyezd
Holocaust locations in Belarus